Anthony or Antonio or Antony Hill may refer to:

 Anthony Hill (cricketer) (1901–1986), English cricketer
 Anthony Hill (artist) (1930–2020), British artist
 Antony Rowland Clegg-Hill, 8th Viscount Hill (1931–2003), British peer
 Anthony Hill (author) (born 1942), Australian author
 Tony Hill (umpire) (Anthony Lloyd Hill, born 1951), New Zealand cricket umpire
 Tony Hill (politician) (Anthony C. Hill, born 1957), American politician
 Tony Hill (defensive end) (Antonio LaVosia Hill, born 1968), (American football player
 Anthony Hill (squash player) (born 1969), Australian squash player
 Anthony F. Hill (active from 1986), New Zealand chemist working in Australia
 Anthony Hill (rugby union) (born 1973), Australian rugby union footballer
 Anthony Hill (American football) (born 1985), American football player
Anthony Hill, US veteran shot and killed by police in 2015; see Shooting of Anthony Hill
 Anthony Hill (industrialist) (1784–1862), Welsh industrialist, owner of the Plymouth Ironworks

See also 
 Tony Hill (disambiguation)
 Battle of Anthony's Hill, a military engagement in 1864 during the American Civil War
 Tony Hills (American football) (Anthony Tremaine Hills, born 1984), American professional footballer